The A5 is a  motorway, located in the Lisbon metropolitan area, Portugal. It connects Lisbon with Cascais. The motorway is also known as Estoril Coast Motorway and it overlaps the Complementary Itinerary 15 (IC15).

The first section of the highway – connecting the Duarte Pacheco Viaduct in the City of Lisbon with the National Stadium in the Oeiras Municipality – was opened in 1944, becoming the first motorway in Portugal and one of the first in the world. From 1945 to the early 1980s, it was officially designated National Road 7 (N7), when it became the A5. The last section of the A5 was opened in 1991.

Motorways in Portugal
Cascais